Toni L is one of the three artists comprising the famous German rap group Advanced Chemistry formed in 1987. Born as Toni Landomini, yet often referred to as “der pate” or “the Godfather,”  Toni holds German citizenship but has an Italian background. His Italian roots provide him with material for his rap songs, such as in Advanced Chemistry’s hit single “Fremd Im Eigenen Land” (A Foreigner In My Own Country), where the group discusses the struggle to be accepted as a German. Toni has produced solo releases, beginning with his debut “Der Pate,” hence leading to his nickname. He has also founded the German hip-hop label MZEE.

Discography

Solo 
 1997 - Der Pate
 2000 - Der Funkjoker
 2005 - Der Zug rollt (Toni L & Def Cut)
 2007 - Funkanimal (Toni L & Safarisounds)

With Advanced Chemistry 
 1992 - Fremd im eigenen Land
 1993 - Welcher Pfad führt zur Geschichte?
 1994 - Operation Artikel 3
 Dir fehlt der Funk
 1995 - Advanced Chemistry

Features 
2000 - "Wir waren mal Stars", "Wer ich bin" (Who I am), "Rote Wellen" (Red waves), "Als ich zur Schule ging" (When I went to school) by Torch (Album: Blauer Samt)
"Zimmer 101" (Room 101) by Peripherique

References

Living people
German rappers
German people of Italian descent
Year of birth missing (living people)